Jorge Márquez may refer to:

 Jorge L. Márquez Pérez (born 1960), Puerto Rican politician
 Jorge Márquez (footballer, born 1988), Venezuelan football midfielder
 Jorge Márquez (footballer, born 1990), Mexican football forward